Brady McKay Smith (born June 5, 1973, in Royal Oak, Michigan) is a former American football defensive end in the National Football League. He was drafted by the New Orleans Saints in the third round of the 1996 NFL Draft. He played college football at Colorado State.

Smith also played for the Atlanta Falcons.

Professional career

New Orleans Saints
Smith was drafted by the New Orleans Saints in the third round of the 1996 NFL Draft. He played for them from 1996 to 1999. During the four years he started 27 of 62 games, recording 91 tackles and 13 sacks.

Atlanta Falcons
Smith signed with the Atlanta Falcons before the 2000 season. He played for the team from 2000 to 2005. In the six years he started 78 of 81 games, recording 169 tackles, 32 sacks and an interception.

NFL Stats

References

American football defensive ends
Colorado State Rams football players
New Orleans Saints players
Atlanta Falcons players
1973 births
Living people